Composite bar charts are charts where each bar displays multiple data points stacked in a single row or column.  This may, for instance, take the form of uniform height bars charting a time series with internal stacked colours indicating the percentage participation of a sub-type of data.  Another example would be a time series displaying total numbers, with internal colors indicating participation in the total by sub-types.

External links
https://web.archive.org/web/20090919064218/http://www.tda.gov.uk/skillstests/numeracy/practicematerials/areascovered/barcharts.aspx
https://nrich.maths.org/5424

Statistical charts and diagrams